William George Linich (February 22, 1940 – July 18, 2016), known professionally as Billy Name, was an American photographer, filmmaker, and lighting designer. He was the archivist of The Factory from 1964 to 1970. His brief romance and subsequent friendship with Andy Warhol led to substantial collaboration on Warhol's work, including his films, paintings, and sculptures. Linich became Billy Name among the clique known as the Warhol superstars. He was responsible for "silverizing" Warhol's New York studio, the Factory, where he lived until 1970. His photographs of the scene at the Factory and of Warhol are important documents of the pop art era.

In 2001, the United States Postal Service used one of Billy Name's portraits of Warhol when it issued a commemorative stamp of the artist. Name also collaborated with Shepard Fairey with his photograph of Nico, singer with the Velvet Underground and part of the social circle of Warhol's Factory. He photographed the covers for the Velvet Underground's White Light/White Heat and their eponymous third album as well as the photographs in the gatefold sleeve for The Velvet Underground and Nico (in collaboration with fellow Warhol associate Nat Finkelstein).

Career in theater 
The origin of Linich's assumption of his theatrical surname was explained this way: "He acquired his superstar identity. While he was filling in an official form, his pen hovered… Name...Billy...He wrote. He had become Billy Name."

Before his association with Warhol, Name had worked in theatrical lighting design. Name began his career as a lighting designer in the theater in 1960 while working as a waiter at Serendipity 3, the mid-town dessert establishment. His first apprenticeship was with Nick Cernovich, part of the Black Mountain College contingency in New York in the 1950s, who had won an Obie Award for best lighting. "It was the end of the period of the romantic avant-garde bohemia, when artists kept younger artists and a male artist would always have a young man around." Under the tutelage of Cernovich, he co-designed the lighting for the Spoleto Festival of Two Worlds in 1960. Name later designed lighting at Judson Memorial Church, New York Poets Theater and the Living Theater, illuminating  dancers such as Lucinda Childs, Yvonne Rainer, Merce Cunningham and Fred Herko.

Name significantly influenced Warhol's work. Warhol later said: "[He] had a manner that inspired confidence. He gave the impression of being generally creative, he dabbled in lights and papers and artists materials...I picked up a lot from Billy." (Warhol & Hackett,The Warhol Diaries)

Name also played music in the group Theatre of Eternal Music under the direction of La Monte Young.

Collaboration with Andy Warhol 
Name had met Warhol fleetingly at Serendipity 3, where he was a waiter, and then later through Ray Johnson, who brought Name to an event at the Brooklyn Academy of Music. Johnson had attended Black Mountain College in the 1940s, and the younger Linich was a fan of that circle's pre-Beat, zen way of interacting with the world. Name met Warhol again when the collagist, pre-Pop and graphic artist Johnson brought Andy to one of Linich's haircutting parties in his East Village apartment and Warhol saw the place done up in silver foil and paint.

According to Stephen Shore's Factory: Andy Warhol, "Andy and I were hanging around together. I had an apartment on the Lower East Side, where I had haircutting salons. Hundreds of people would come, and I'd be cutting someone's hair. Andy came. When he first started making films, he made films about what a person was famous for," Billy, whose real name was William Linich Jr., and was the son of a barber, recalled. "I was famous for giving haircuts, so he said, "Would you let me do a film of you doing haircuts?" [Haircut, 1963] I had covered my entire apartment in silver foil and painted everything silver. Andy said "Well, I just got a new loft [the Factory]; would you do to it what you've done to your apartment?" I said "Oh, sure, let's do it." So, I started doing it. I was a technician— I'd been a light designer for [Manhattan dance theatre] the Judson Church. I also worked for some off-Broadway theater and avant-garde dance companies. I installed all the lighting at the Factory, all the sound systems."

In return for making over his loft, Warhol gave Name a new role within the Factory. "I was into light and sound before, but not photography," Name said. "Andy had a still camera, but he had gotten the Bolex. He was going to start to do films, and he gave me the Pentax and said "Here, Billy, you do the still photography; I'm going to start making films." I became the in-house photographer and was sort of like the foreman. Eventually I moved in." Name and Warhol eventually became lovers, but the romantic aspect of their relationship slowly dissolved into mutual loyalty and admiration.

Name was responsible for taking still photographs at the Factory. Name lived and worked at the Factory, having taken residence in a closet at the back of the studio at 231 East 47th Street. With the gift of Warhol's 35 mm single-lens reflex Honeywell Pentax camera, along with its operating manual, Name taught himself the technical aspects of photography. He converted one of the Factory bathrooms into a darkroom, where he learned to process film. This, combined with his background in lighting and experimental approach to his work, resulted in a body of work which captured the "silver years" at the Factory (1963–70). Name's close friendship with Warhol – and his role in creating Warhol's artistic environment – provided him with a unique perspective of the Factory, with a particular focus on a core group of superstars, who largely improvised before the camera.

Quotations about Name 
 "Billy Name exquisitely transforms sexploitation into glamour, and the 'nudie' into a work of beauty." Debra Miller, on Name's stills from the 1967 Warhol film The Nude Restaurant.
 "B. Linich is like a dog, a poodle--one does not have to have the same responsibilities towards him as towards other people--he is loved for the reasons a poodle is loved." Soren Angenoux
 "Billy Linich arrived [at Diane di Prima's California home] the earliest and stayed the longest. Billy was at that time doing a bit of everything: writing, collaging, taking odd combinations of drugs, making mots that sounded way hipper than they probably were, and mostly looking wise with a little half-smile and crinkly eyes." Diane di Prima

Later life 
Name resided in his native Poughkeepsie, New York until his death in 2016.

In 1994, he produced a short lived (5-8 episodes) cable television series The Bunka Krunka Show on TCI Cable Channel 32. He worked with Emmy Award-winning video editor Nicholas Apuzzo as well as film and video editor Nick Stamper. No known archive recordings exist.

Bibliography 
 
All Tomorrow's Parties: Billy Name's Photographs of Andy Warhol's Factory, by Billy Name, Dave Hickey, and Collier Schorr;  Distributed Art Publishers (DAP) (August 1997)
Billy Name: Stills from the Warhol Films by Debra Miller;  Prestel Pub (March 1994)
 Scherman, Tony & Dalton, David, POP: The Genius of Andy Warhol, HarperCollins, New York, N.Y. 2009
 Steven Watson, Factory Made: Warhol and the Sixties (2003) Pantheon, New York

Collective exhibition 
2010: Les Rencontres d'Arles festival, France.

References

External links 

Warholstars.com profile of Billy Name

1940 births
2016 deaths
American photographers
People from Poughkeepsie, New York
American LGBT photographers
American lighting designers
Place of death missing
American filmmakers
LGBT people from New York (state)
The Velvet Underground
Album-cover and concert-poster artists
People associated with The Factory